Baldi's Basics in Education and Learning (also known as Baldi's Basics and Baldi's Basics Classic) is a 2018 horror video game created by American indie developer Micah McGonigal, known by the pseudonym Mystman12. The game satirizes educational games of the 1990s through poor graphics and similar themes (such as Sonic's Schoolhouse, I.M. Meen and 3D Dinosaur Adventure), and later deconstructed its elements into a metafictional horror genre in recent updates, such in conclusion of a package version Baldi's Basics Classic Remastered.

Game history 
Baldi's Basics was first released in beta on March 31, 2018 via Itch.io for Microsoft Windows and macOS. A full release of the game, including additional content and a story mode, titled Baldi's Basics Plus, was published in early access on June 12, 2020, with development ongoing.

Plot
A friend of the protagonist forgets seven notebooks at the local schoolhouse but cannot get them himself because he would be late for "eating practice", so he asks the protagonist to fetch them. Once the player arrives, Baldi, one of the teachers, quizzes the player with simple math problems every time they find a notebook (three per book), offering a chance of getting "something special" if they answer all of them correctly. Once the questions are all answered correctly, Baldi offers the protagonist a quarter, granting them access to use a vending machine that distributes boosters when they first get past the yellow swinging doors. Baldi is also very easy to anger and, after presenting the player with impossible math problems, will start to chase them when they inevitably fail to answer them correctly. The protagonist is forced to continue to search for all the other notebooks while also avoiding other students and various obstacles.

Alternate ending 
If the player chooses to answer every question wrong in seven notebooks, they will experience an ending which includes an enlarged and rotated version of Baldi and another hidden character, Null, asking the player to destroy the game, before the game closes itself.

Gameplay 
In the game, the player must locate all seven notebooks without being caught by their teacher, Baldi. Other students and faculty attempt to hinder the player by forcing them to participate in various activities. Each notebook contains three simple arithmetic problems using the mathematics subject, but the third question is unsolvable in the second notebook onwards. As the player continues to fail the impossible questions, Baldi moves faster and becomes harder to avoid. 

Once the player collects all of the notebooks, Baldi will seem to congratulate them before shouting at the player to "get out while you still can" (BBC)/telling the player to "find an exit before he catches you" (BBCR). There are three trick exits and only one that will let the player escape, and the player has to trigger all three before they can use the real exit.

The player can collect different items from around the schoolhouse, such as a candy bar that keeps their stamina from dropping for a short period of time, a soda that can be used to blast characters away, a pair of scissors that can temporarily disable some of the obstacles, and several other items.

As the player proceeds throughout the game, numerous students and staff of the schoolhouse will come into contact with them, forcing them to participate in numerous activates. These include, Playtime, a young nearsighted girl who will force the player to play a game of jumprope, Principle of the Thing, the schoolhouse's principal who forces the player to stay in detention for a short period of time if they break any of the school rules within his sight, and This is a Bully, a school bully who will block the player's path and refuse to let them pass unless they give him one of their inventory items. Additional characters include 1st Prize, a robot with romantic feelings towards the player who can be helpful with pushing the player away from Baldi, Gotta Sweep, a giant broom that will sweep the floors while announcing it and can get the player and Baldi caught in it's path, pushing them both around the schoolhouse, and Arts and Crafters, a sock puppet with googly eyes that will teleport the player close to Baldi once they have collected seven notebooks.

Development and release 
The game was initially made as an entry in the annual Meta-Game Jam on Itch.io, where it received 2nd place. In an interview with Game Developer, the game's developer cited the 1996 game Sonic’s Schoolhouse as his main inspiration. The game was originally going to be made for the 3DS using SmileBasic.

The developer launched a Kickstarter campaign for the game, where he announced that an early access prototype for the full game, titled Baldi's Basics Plus, would be released on June 12, 2020. The Kickstarter raised a total of $61,375. Development has been ongoing ever since, with additional content such as new characters, new items, minigames, challenge modes, 'field trips' and a new layout for the schoolhouse, incorporating multiple levels and procedural generation, similar to a first-person roguelike and dungeon crawler hybrid game.

On October 21, 2022, a remaster and compilation of three games on PC platforms titled Baldi's Basics Classic Remastered was released, which includes the original game, the birthday edition of the game Baldi's Basics Birthday Bash, and the demo Baldi's Basics Plus, with additional features such as fun settings and more alternate endings.

Reception 
Despite its poor graphics, it became highly popular for its humor, difficulty and surreal gameplay. Popular YouTubers such as DanTDM, Markiplier, Jacksepticeye, PewDiePie, 8-BitRyan, Kindly Keyin, The Frustrated Gamer and Dakblake made videos on the game, helping to boost its popularity.

References

External links 
 

2018 video games
Android (operating system) games
2010s horror video games
Indie video games
Video games developed in the United States
IOS games
MacOS games
Parody video games
Survival video games
Windows games
Linux games
Video games with 2.5D graphics
Video games with pre-rendered 3D graphics
Video game memes
Retro-style video games
Internet memes introduced in 2018
Metafictional video games
Kickstarter-funded video games